Charlotte Ryan is a New Zealand radio broadcaster and music journalist.

Biography 
Ryan was born and grew up in Christchurch. She attended Villa Maria College and the University of Canterbury, where she studied education and sociology. While at university she volunteered at RDU, the university radio station. On graduating she worked at the station for a short time then moved to Auckland to work for the University of Auckland's radio station, bFM.

She has managed bands and artists such as Shapeshifter and Ladi6 and ran her own publicity business for a time. In 2008 she returned to bFM as a presenter and in 2012 moved to KiwiFM until it closed. Ryan then spent four years working for Neil Finn.

Ryan is the host of Music 101, a weekly radio programme on Radio New Zealand.

References 

People educated at Villa Maria College, Christchurch
University of Canterbury alumni
New Zealand radio presenters
New Zealand women radio presenters